Surya Putrulu is a 1997 Indian Telugu-language drama film directed by C. Umamaheswara Rao. The film stars Mammootty, Suman, Shobana, Nagma and Malashri. This marked Shobana's last Telugu film as a leading actress. 
This movie is famous for the erotic first night song picturised on Nagma. Later dubbed into Tamil as Prathinidhi.

Cast 
Mammooty
Suman
Shobana
Nagma
Malashri

Soundtrack

References

External links
 

1990 films
1990s Telugu-language films
Indian drama films
Films scored by M. M. Keeravani